Nick William Dushenski (September 4, 1920 – February 13, 2009) was a provincial politician from Alberta, Canada. He served as a member of the Legislative Assembly of Alberta from 1952 to 1959 sitting as an MLA with the opposition Co-operative Commonwealth Federation caucus.

Personal life and career
Dushenski was born in Whitford, Alberta, the youngest of nine children. At the age of 21, he began his teaching career in a one-room schoolhouse in Beaverdam, Alberta and would teach throughout northern British Columbia and Alberta until settling in Willingdon, Alberta in 1946 where he would teach until 1979, as well as run a farm with his wife and their 8 children.

Political career
Dushenski ran for a seat to the Alberta Legislature in the 1948 Alberta general election as a Co-operative Commonwealth candidate in the electoral district of Willingdon. He was defeated in a closely contested two-way race by incumbent William Tomyn.

Tomyn and Dushenski faced each other for the second time in the 1952 Alberta general election. Dushenski finished first place on the first vote count ahead of Tomyn by 44 votes. On the second vote preferences Dushenski surged to pick up the district with a respectable majority. Dushenski became one of two CCF MLAs in the Alberta legislature, alongside party leader Elmer Roper.

Dushenski ran for a second term in the 1955 Alberta general election. He won another closely contested three-way election defeating future MLA Nicholas Melnyk on the second vote count to hold his seat.

The 1955 election saw  CCF leader Elmer Roper lose his seat, although the CCF picked up a seat allowing it to continue with a two-seat caucus. As the more experienced of the two, Dushenski became the CCF's house leader and was de facto leader of the party until Floyd Albin Johnson became party leader in 1957. As Johnson was not an MLA, Dushenski continued as the party's parliamentary leader until the next election.

Dushenski retired from public office at dissolution of the assembly in 1959 and resumed his teaching career.

Late life
Dushenski returned to the Alberta Legislature in 2006 with Raymond Reierson and Arthur Dixon as the most senior members at the 100th Anniversary celebration of the Alberta Legislature. He died three years later on February 13, 2009.

References

External links
Legislative Assembly of Alberta Members Listing

1920 births
2009 deaths
Alberta Co-operative Commonwealth Federation MLAs
20th-century Canadian politicians
People from Lamont County
Canadian people of Ukrainian descent
Canadian socialists of Ukrainian descent
Canadian socialists